This is the solo discography of Scottish musician Paul Haig.

Albums

Studio albums

Compilation albums

EPs

Singles

References

Discographies of British artists
Rock music discographies